Trinidad and Tobago competed at the 2019 Parapan American Games held from August 23 to September 1, 2019 in Lima, Peru. In total, athletes representing Trinidad and Tobago won two gold medals, one silver medal and one bronze medal. All medals were won in athletics. The country finished in 12th place in the medal table.

Medalists

Athletics 

Nyoshia Cain-Claxton won the gold medal in the women's 100 metres T64 event and the bronze medal in the women's 200 metres T64 event.

Akeem Stewart won the gold medal in the men's discus throw F64 event and the silver medal in the men's javelin throw F64 event.

Ronald Carlos Greene represented Trinidad and Tobago in the men's shot put F11 and men's discus throw F11 events at the 2019 Parapan American Games.

Swimming 

Shanntol Ince represented Trinidad and Tobago in swimming at the 2019 Parapan American Games.

Table tennis 

Dennis La Rose represented Trinidad and Tobago in table tennis at the 2019 Parapan American Games.

References 

2019 in Trinidad and Tobago sport
Nations at the 2019 Parapan American Games